Rosie Brennan (born 2 December 1988) is an American cross-country skier. On 13 December 2020, she became the second American cross-country skier to win back-to-back World Cup races, after Kikkan Randall in 2011.

She represented US at the 2015 World Championships in Falun, the 2017 World Championships in Lahti, the 2018 Winter Olympics, and the 2019 World Championships in Seefeld.

Cross-country skiing results
All results are sourced from the International Ski Federation (FIS).

Olympic Games

World Championships

World Cup

Season standings

Individual podiums
2 victories – (2 )
7 podiums – (4 , 3 )

Team podiums
1 victory – (1 ) 
5 podiums – (4 , 1 )

References

External links 
 
 
 

1988 births
Living people
American female cross-country skiers
Tour de Ski skiers
Cross-country skiers at the 2018 Winter Olympics
Cross-country skiers at the 2022 Winter Olympics
Olympic cross-country skiers of the United States
People from Park City, Utah
21st-century American women